Man in the Wilderness is a 1971 American revisionist Western film about a scout for a group of mountain men who are traversing the Northwestern United States during the 1820s.  The scout is mauled by a bear and left to die by his companions.  He survives and recuperates sufficiently to track his former comrades, forcing a confrontation over his abandonment.  The story is loosely based on the life of Hugh Glass. It stars Richard Harris as Zachary Bass and John Huston as Captain Henry.

The expedition in the movie is notable for bringing a large boat with it, borne on wheels.

Plot
A classic survival story, told partly through flashbacks to Zachary Bass's past. After being left for dead by his fellow trappers, he undergoes a series of trials and adventures as he slowly heals and equips himself while he tracks the expedition, apparently intent on retribution for his abandonment, while earning the respect of the American Indians he encounters.  However, when he finally confronts his fellow trappers and Captain Henry, he chooses not to seek revenge, but instead to focus on returning to his infant son.

Cast 
 Richard Harris – Zachary Bass
 John Huston – Captain Henry
 Henry Wilcoxon – Indian Chief
 Prunella Ransome – Grace
 Percy Herbert – Fogarty
 Dennis Waterman – Lowrie
 Norman Rossington – Ferris
 James Doohan – Benoit
 Bryan Marshall – Potts
 Ben Carruthers – Longbow
 John Bindon – Coulter
 Robert Russell – Smith
 Sheila Raynor – Grace's Mother
 Judith Furse – Nurse

Production
Man in the Wilderness is based loosely on the 1818–20 Missouri Expedition and "Capt. Henry" is likely a fictionalized Major Andrew Henry of the Rocky Mountain Fur Company. It was based on an original script by Jack De Witt, and bought by producer Sandy Howard. In December 1970 Howard announced that the film would star Richard Harris, who had made A Man Called Horse for Howard. Elliot Silverstein directed Horse but clashed with Harris so Richard Sarafian was bought in to direct this film. Howard said he was "convinced" that Sarafian "is going to be one of the most important directors in America very soon."

Filming took three months from April to June 1971. The film was shot near Covaleda, Province of Soria, Spain, with the terrain looking more like the Adirondack wilderness and less like the Absaroka Range country of the Yellowstone River. Not technically a "Spaghetti Western", Man was filmed in the rugged highlands where David Lean had shot some of the scenes for Doctor Zhivago in 1964.

John Huston joined the production a few days after quitting as director of the film The Last Run due to on-set fights with George C. Scott.

The bear who attacks Harris' character was called Peg. The attack sequence was filmed using a dummy.

"This movie is Genesis to me," said Harris. "It's my apocalypse. It's a very special and very personal statement about a man struggling for personal identity, looking for God and discovering Him in the wilderness, in leaves and trees. It's all the things that the young people, and we, are missing today."

Harris only had nine lines of dialogue.

Themes
Though survival and revenge are the main themes, Christianity and religion play a significant role in the evolution of the main character, who is shown through flashbacks to be at odds with religion and God in general due to his lonely and abusive childhood involving indoctrination into Christianity.

Release
The film was theatrically released in the United States on November 24, 1971, including New York City, New York and Los Angeles, California.

The film was the first feature to be shown in years at the newly refurbished Princess Theatre (renamed the Klondike Theatre, at the time) in Edmonton, Alberta, Canada on December 25, 1971.

See also
 List of American films of 1971
 Lord Grizzly, a 1954 biographical novel by Frederick Manfred, about the Hugh Glass story
 Survival film, about the film genre, with a list of related films
 The Revenant (2015), also about Hugh Glass
 The Song of Hugh Glass, an epic poem from 1915, part of A Cycle of the West, written by John Neihardt, who is most famous for his book Black Elk Speaks.

References

External links 
 
 
 
 

1971 films
1971 drama films
1971 Western (genre) films
1970s action drama films
1970s adventure drama films
Western (genre) films based on actual events
American Western (genre) films
American adventure drama films
American biographical drama films
American films about revenge
American survival films
Films about Native Americans
Works about mountain men
Films directed by Richard C. Sarafian
Films set in Montana
Films set in North Dakota
Films set in South Dakota
Films set in Wyoming
Films set in the 1820s
Films shot in Mexico
Films shot in Spain
Warner Bros. films
1970s English-language films
Hugh Glass
1970s American films